The Itapicuru-Mirim River is a river of Bahia state in eastern Brazil. It is an important tributary of the Itapicuru River.

Numerous springs in the Sete Passagens State Park supply streams that contribute to the Itapicuru-Mirim River.

See also
List of rivers of Bahia

References

Brazilian Ministry of Transport

Rivers of Bahia